Nicholas Bruno Rumbelow (born September 6, 1991) is an American former professional baseball pitcher. He made his MLB debut in 2015 with the New York Yankees and has also played for the Seattle Mariners in Major League Baseball.

Career

Amateur
Rumbelow attended Bullard High School in Bullard, Texas where, as a senior, he recorded an earned run average (ERA) of 0.52 with 11 wins and a batting average of .422 with 29 runs batted in. Rumbelow was named to the Tyler Morning Telegraph's all-East Texas team as a senior in 2010.

After high school, Rumbelow chose to play college baseball at Louisiana State University (LSU) for the LSU Tigers over competing opportunities at Rice, Oregon State, Clemson, Florida and Baylor. In three seasons from 2011 to 2013, Rumbelow appeared in 70 games and had a 3–0 win–loss record and 3.68 ERA. In 2012, he played collegiate summer baseball with the Wareham Gatemen of the Cape Cod Baseball League, where he was named a league all-star. He was drafted by the New York Yankees in the seventh round of the 2013 Major League Baseball Draft.

New York Yankees
Rumbelow made his professional debut with the Staten Island Yankees of the Class A-Short Season New York-Penn League. He started 2014 with the Charleston RiverDogs of the Class A South Atlantic League and was promoted to the Tampa Yankees of the Class A-Advanced Florida State League, Trenton Thunder of the Double-A Eastern League, and Scranton/Wilkes-Barre RailRiders of the Triple-A International League during the season. In total for the season, he was 5–2 with a 2.62 ERA and eight saves in 42 games consisting of  innings pitched.

After starting the 2015 season with Scranton/Wilkes-Barre, Rumbelow was promoted to the major leagues on June 22. He made his major league debut the next day, and was optioned to Scranton/Wilkes-Barre on July 8. Rumbelow received several promotions to the major leagues and demotions to Scranton/Wilkes-Barre. He had a 1–1 record and a 4.02 ERA in  innings pitched for the Yankees in 2015.

Rumbelow began the 2016 season with Scranton/Wilkes Barre. On April 11, 2016, the team announced that Rumbelow would undergo Tommy John surgery, forcing him to hold out of baseball activities for the remainder of the 2016 season. Rumbelow was designated for assignment by the Yankees after the 2016 season. He returned to pitch for Scranton/Wilkes-Barre in July 2017 and he pitched to a 5–1 record with a 1.12 ERA in 17 games. The Yankees re-added Rumbelow to their 40-man roster after the end of the season.

Seattle Mariners
After the 2017 season, the Yankees traded Rumbelow to the Seattle Mariners for Juan Then and JP Sears. Rumbelow suffered a brachial plexus injury, and missed the beginning of the 2018 season. He was activated from the disabled list on June 5 and assigned to the Tacoma Rainiers of the Triple-A Pacific Coast League, where he pitched in three games before the Mariners promoted him to the major leagues on June 14.

He was designated for assignment on May 17, 2019 and outrighted on May 22. He was released by the Mariners organization on June 12.

Sugar Land Skeeters
On June 25, 2019, Rumbelow signed with the Sugar Land Skeeters of the Atlantic League of Professional Baseball. He pitched in 21 games and threw 22 1/3 innings going 3-0 with a 0.81 era and 31 strikeouts.

New York Mets
On August 19, 2019, the New York Mets selected Rumbelow's contract. He was released on May 28, 2020.

Sugar Land Skeeters (second stint)
Rumbelow signed on to play for the Sugar Land Skeeters of the Constellation Energy League (a makeshift 4-team independent league created as a result of the COVID-19 pandemic) for the 2020 season.

References

External links

LSU Tigers bio

1991 births
Living people
Baseball players from Texas
Major League Baseball pitchers
New York Yankees players
Seattle Mariners players
LSU Tigers baseball players
Wareham Gatemen players
Staten Island Yankees players
Charleston RiverDogs players
Tampa Yankees players
Trenton Thunder players
Scranton/Wilkes-Barre RailRiders players
Sugar Land Skeeters players
Tacoma Rainiers players
People from Bullard, Texas
Arkansas Travelers players
Syracuse Mets players